Tamir Sapir (born Temur Sepiashvili, ; 1946/1947 – September 26, 2014) was a Georgian-born, Georgian-American businessman, real estate developer and investor. He was the founder of the Sapir Organization, a real estate investment firm based in New York City. Sapir originally made his fortune trading oil and fertilizers with the Soviet Union during the 1980s. He became a billionaire in 2002, with his wealth peaking in 2007 at US$2 billion, according to Forbes.

Early life and education
Temur Sepiashvili was born to a Jewish family in Tbilisi, Georgia. His father was a major in the Soviet Army. In the early 1970s he studied journalism at Tbilisi State University but left to earn money to support his family because of his father's death.

Career
He took a job processing emigration applications for Soviet Jews and in 1973, he immigrated to Israel with his wife around the time of the Yom Kippur War. He changed his last name to Sapir while in Israel and moved to the United States first to Louisville, Kentucky where he learned English and worked as a bus driver, janitor and a loader; and then to New York City where he worked as a taxicab driver borrowing money for his medallion. He then opened an electronics store with fellow immigrant Sam Kislin, Joy Lud International Distributors on Fifth Avenue, catering primarily to Russian clientele.

Sapir made contacts with the Soviet contingent to the United Nations in New York, and started trading electronics, clothing, and footwear for exclusive rights to sell Soviet oil and oil products which he then sold to American companies. Investing the profits in Manhattan real estate in the 1990s, which was then in a slump, he became a billionaire by 2002. Sapir has been referred to as America's "billionaire cabbie".

Sapir brought a lawsuit in Russia against a Moscow oil refinery after it violated the terms of a contract by failing to transfer oil products for delivered equipment. Sapir won the case in 2005, but received none of the $28 million the Moscow company was ordered to pay.

Sapir was a financier and development partner for the construction of the Trump SoHo in Manhattan in 2006.

Sapir Organization
In 2006, Sapir named his son Alex the chairman and President of the Sapir Organization.

Personal life
Sapir was married twice. His first marriage to Bella Sapir ended in divorce. He has five children: Ruth Sapir Barinstein (born 1973), Zina Sapir (born 1974), Alex Sapir (born 1980), Zita, Eli. His second wife was Elena Ponomareva. He was a member of the Park East Synagogue in Manhattan. He built the Congregation of Georgian Jews synagogue in Rego Park, Queens. He died on September 26, 2014, aged 67. He has 6 grandchildren, Ariana, Gabriel Barinstein. David, Raquel Rosen and Sebastian and Timur Sapir.

His daughter, Zina Sapir and Rotem Rosen, the CEO of Africa Israel USA and close to Lev Leviev of Africa Israel Investments, were married on December 20, 2007, at Mar-a-Lago with the Pussycat Dolls and Lionel Richie performing. Friends of the couple, Donald Trump and Jared Kushner, were invited to the June 1, 2008, bris of their infant son. Rotem Rosen was pivotal to Lev Leviev's April 2007 purchase of the Times Building on West 43rd Street for $525 million.

His three mansion estate, The Fountains was an expanded version of a 1928 mansion. It is located at 26 Pond Road, Great Neck, New York. It is currently for sale at an asking price of $55 million.

References

External links
 "$40 Million Man", Forbes.com, January 12, 2006
 "Timur Sapir. The Long Road to Wealth", newtimes.ru, May 2006 interview 
 "The Adventures Of Timur Sapir", russians.rin.ru (in Russian) 
 "Yacht Stuffed With Exotic Animals Seized", nbcnewyork.com; accessed October 3, 2014.

1940s births
2014 deaths
American billionaires
American businesspeople in retailing
American businesspeople in the oil industry
American people of Georgian-Jewish descent
American real estate businesspeople
Businesspeople from New York (state)
Soviet emigrants to Israel
Israeli emigrants to the United States
Jews from Georgia (country)
People from Kings Point, New York
Billionaires from Georgia (country)
20th-century American businesspeople